Yağlıdere is a town and district of Giresun Province in the Black Sea region of Turkey.

The district covers one end of the Giresun Mountains, including part of the valley of the Yağlıdere stream, which gives the district its name. When the mountain streams that feed the Yağlıdere are in full flood, they can become a threat to the district.

Yağlıdere is an agricultural district. The hillsides are planted with hazelnuts, fruit trees, chestnuts, and other deciduous trees. Some tea and corn are grown, and animals graze on the higher slopes.

The small town of Yağlıdere was founded in 1811 with a marketplace and large mosque.  7,095 people live there.  A large portion of the population has migrated to America, especially New York and New Jersey, giving the town its nicknames New Yağlıdere and Little New York.

Etymology

Yağlıdere means "fat stream". There are two hypotheses regarding the origin of the name. One says that in Cakrak village, an ancient Greek town, people use stone tubes from high parts of village to transport milk to the riverside, or town center, making the river seem fat. Others say that the river is cursed by Saint Hacı Abdullah Halife, who says "be fat, river, and take one person's life every year."

The town's original name was "Camiyanı" ("next to the mosque").

History

Yağlıdere has historically belonged to the Colchis Kingdom, Pontus Kingdom, Roman Empire, Trabzon Greek Empire, and Ottoman Empire.

Colchis was a wealthy kingdom, rich with mineral deposits. The Colchis used gold and mined other materials. The region also was rich with fruits and wild vegetables. After the Colchis Kingdom's reign and before the Roman Empire expanded, the king Mithridates VI of Pontus ran away to Sinoria and built 75 strongholds in this area.

The Roman Empire, under Justinian I, built many bridges, churches, and monasteries in the region.

Tourism

Known as a fertile and rainy land, Yağlıdere is one of the most important Turkish eco-tourism centers in the 21st century. Several native crops offer local organic cuisine, and the village is known for having healthy inhabitants as a result of the food.

Common tourist activities include a visit to the tomb of Sarı Halife in Tekkeköy, resting in Ayvat in Sinirköy (Sinoria) for a glass of tea, or sampling the local meat.

Other attractions include Golyani (meaning "nearby lake"), a high plateau with impressive views; the old churches in Cakrak; swimming in the stream during the summertime; and Akilbaba Hill (2.800 m), which offers views of the mountains on sunny days.  The terrain includes both beaches and forests, featuring oak, alder, pine, and hazelnut trees. In July, there are summer festivals in Bulari, Kazikbeli and Kümbet.

Most parts of the region have comfortable tourist accommodations, with the exception of some of the more remote mountain villages. When staying for more than a few weeks, it is traditional to give the locals a gift of fruits and vegetables.

Cuisine

The highlands produce dairy products, including several cheeses. "Tecen peyniri" is made with herbs and spices, typically consumed with breakfast.  Another very dry cheese is used to make muhlama (kuymak, havits) or cheese fondue.

The most well-known vegetable in the region is dark cabbage. The cabbage is used in a variety of dishes, including "kara lahana dolmasi" and "dible", a variation on the standard Turkish dolma.

Some consider Black Sea food the best in Turkey, particularly the fruit such as cherries and apricots.

Weather

The coastal regions have much milder winters and snow is rare. The Black Sea coast is a little colder in winter than the west and south coasts. The Black Sea coast has some rain year round and east of Samsun the rain is heavy in the summer and autumn. Summers are warm and humid and the weather is often cloudy and temperamental.

The interior plateau is typically dry and has cold or very cold winters. The eastern plateau is as cold in winter as parts of the Russian Federation. Snowfall is common in the winter and in the east a ground covering of snow for three and four months is common. Except at the higher elevations, summers in the interior are warm or hot with occasional thunderstorms.

Immigration to the United States

 there are 15,000 immigrants to the US from Yağlıdere. Most immigrants live on the East Coast, including New York, New Jersey, Connecticut, and Delaware. In 1960s most emigrated for work, and later for both work and education.

In November 2017, U.S-born Hacıbey Çatalbaşoğlu, whose parents hail from Yağlıdere, became the youngest politician in U.S. history after his election to the municipal council in New Haven, Connecticut.

References

External links
District governor's official website
 Yağlıdere Belediyesi
  local information
  and more

Populated places in Giresun Province
Districts of Giresun Province
Towns in Turkey